Reggie "Super Gnat" Smith (born July 15, 1956) is a former Arena football wide receiver/defensive back in the Arena Football League (AFL). He played college football at North Carolina Central University.

In 2002, Smith was elected into the Arena Football Hall of Fame.

References

1956 births
Living people
American football wide receivers
American football defensive backs
North Carolina Central Eagles football players
Atlanta Falcons players
Washington Federals/Orlando Renegades players
Chicago Bruisers players
New York Jets players
Albany Firebirds players
Orlando Predators players
National Football League replacement players